2004 The National, the third annual edition of The National Grand Slam curling event was held January 22–25, 2004 at the Prince Albert Communiplex in Prince Albert, Saskatchewan. The total purse of the event was $100,000. It was the third of four (men's) PharmAssist Grand Slam events of the 2003-04 curling season.

Glenn Howard, and his rink of Richard Hart, Collin Mitchell and Jason Mitchell from Coldwater, Ontario, won the event, defeating Jeff Stoughton from Winnipeg 5–3. With the win, Team Howard took home $30,000, while Stoughton won $18,000. Howard stole deuces in the first and fifth ends en route to the victory. Team Stoughton had been undefeated at the event up to that point, including defeating Howard 7–2 in the A final. Going into the event, Howard's foursome was ranked 10th on the World Curling Tour money standings, and Stoughton was ranked second. The number 1 ranked Wayne Middaugh rink lost in the third place game to Kerry Burtnyk.  

Five of the top 13 teams (Kevin Martin, John Morris, Jamie King, Randy Ferbey and Jamie Koe) on the Tour opted to not play in the event, as it conflicted with the playdowns for the Alberta men's championships.  

The event featured a special rule called the "Howard Rule", in which the first four rocks of each end could not be removed, even if they were in the rings.

Teams
The teams were as follows:

Draw
The event was a triple knock out.

Playoffs
The playoff scores were as follows:

References

External links

The National
The National (curling)
2004 in Saskatchewan
Sport in Prince Albert, Saskatchewan
Curling in Saskatchewan
January 2004 sports events in Canada